Anniversary (stylized as A N N I V E R S A R Y) is the third studio album by American singer Bryson Tiller. It was released by RCA Records on October 2, 2020, the fifth anniversary of Tiller's debut studio album, Trapsoul. The album includes a sole guest appearance from Drake in the standard edition and a guest appearance from Big Sean in the deluxe edition, released on February 26, 2021.

The album debuted at number five on the US Billboard 200 chart, earning 57,000 album-equivalent units in its first week.

Background and conception
Tiller first teased a new album in the video for the album's lead single "Inhale", released on September 3, 2020. The visual ends with the message: "New album this fall". On September 25, a "deluxe" edition of Trapsoul was released, in preparation for Anniversary, featuring two songs that were previously released on SoundCloud during the Trapsoul era, as well as The Weeknd's remix of Trapsoul cut "Rambo" (titled "Rambo: Last Blood"). He officially announced the album and its title on September 28, posting a short trailer on Twitter. Two days before the album's release, he held a special Zoom listening session with fans, during which he played the entire project for the first time. It was also revealed that the album would include a feature from Canadian rapper Drake. During the session, Tiller said the album was created after "digging through the Trapsoul archives" during a 2020 trip to Los Angeles. He proceeded to work on ideas that he started five years before when making Trapsoul. Tiller called Anniversary the "first wave", stating that he has a lot of new music coming, hinting at his previously-announced album, Serenity. That album was put on hold as he felt that his life at the time did not reflect the album's theme. Tiller described Anniversary as having a "different" energy than True to Self, an album he said he did not want to make due to legal and personal matters. Anniversary is dedicated to his late grandmother.

Cover art
The album artwork was noted for resembling the Trapsoul cover; it shows Tiller facing left in front of a blue-lit space.

Commercial performance
Anniversary debuted at number five on the US Billboard 200 chart, earning 57,000 album-equivalent units, (including 4,000 copies as pure album sales) in its first week. This became Tiller's third US top-ten on the chart. The album accumulated a total of 68.6 million in on-demand streams of the album’s songs that week. The album also debuted at number four on the US Top R&B/Hip-Hop Albums and number one on the US Top R&B Albums charts respectively.

Track listing

Charts

Weekly charts

Year-end charts

References

2020 albums
Bryson Tiller albums
RCA Records albums